Chew Court is a Grade II* listed building next to St Andrew's church in Chew Magna, Somerset, England.

It was originally a palace for Gisa the Bishop of Bath and Wells, however little of the original building survives. After use by a succession of bishops it was sold to the Duke of Somerset.

The oldest portion is the gatehouse at the southern end of the east wing.

The house was largely rebuilt in 1656, from which a little survives as the Chew Court of today including an Elizabethan doorway with Doric pilasters. The room over the gatehouse is said to have been used as a court-room, with the turrets used for holding prisoners. The house now forms an "l" shape of two wings.

In 2011 alterations were made to the driveway leading to the house and additional walls built around the gardens.

References

Houses completed in 1656
Grade II* listed buildings in Bath and North East Somerset
Grade II* listed houses in Somerset
1656 establishments in England